Mafatih al-Ghayb, usually known as al-Tafsir al-Kabir, is a classical Islamic tafsir book, written by the twelfth-century Islamic theologian and philosopher Fakhruddin Razi (d.1210). The book is an exegesis and commentary on the Qur'an. At 32 volumes, it is even larger than the 28-volume Tafsir al-Tabari. It is not unusual for modern works to use it as a reference.

Features
Mufti Muhammad Taqi Usmani has written:

{{cquote|Just as Tafsir Ibn Kathir is the most concise and matchless exegesis from a narrative point of view, so also there is no parallel to Tafsir Kabir in relation to the sciences of Reason. Some people have passed a funny remark on this exegesis (In it, there is everything except exegesis). But the fact is that this remark is cruelly unjust to this book because this book has no equal in the interpretation of the meanings of the Qurān. The prominent features of this book are:

Imam Razi had written this exegesis up to Sūrah al-Fatḥ when he died. Hence, after this Surah another scholar Qāḍi Shahāb-ud-dīn bin Khalīl al-Khaulī, al-Damashqī (died 639 AH) or Shaikh Najm-ud-dīn Aḥmad bin Al-Qamūli (died 777 AH) completed it. It is so marvellously done and the style of Imām Rāzi has been so thoroughly maintained that anyone not aware of this fact would never suspect that this was written by someone other than Imām Rāzi.
The explanation, grammatical composition, and background of revelation, and all the narrations related to them have been described by Imām Rāzi in an organised manner with clarity and detail. Thus, the number of sayings in explanation of a particular verse are reproduced together and easily observed. In other exegeses, these discussions are generally scattered or disorganised, due to which it becomes time-consuming. But in Tafsīr Kabīr they can be found at one place and very well organised.He has described the grandeur and majesty of the Qurān in detail.
The legal injunctions relating to a verse have been described with detailed reasons.
Any interpolations introduced by the erring sects and intellectuals in the meaning of any verse has been described in full and then refuted with detailed arguments. In this way it contains in it strong refutation of all the erring sects of his time, namely, Jahmiyyah, Muʿtazilah, Ibāhiyyah, etc.
A very specific feature of Tafsīr Kabīr to which very little attention has been paid is the description of the link between the verses of the Qurān. It is a fact that the reason for a link and affinity between the verses as described by him is so casual, appealing and reasonable that not only does it impart a sense of satisfaction but also an ecstatic feeling of elegance and grandeur of the Qurān.
Qurānic injunctions and their mysteries and expediences have been very beautifully highlighted.

 The narrations of Tafsīr Kabīr, like other exegeses, are a collection of strong and weak together.
 Occasionally Imām Rāzi has adopted a view different from that of other commentators. For instance, he has rejected the authentic tradition [...] (Ibrahim did not tell a lie except on three occasions).
}}

Mufti Muhammad Taqi Usmani has also written in his autobiography:

Maulana Sayyid Muhammad Yoosuf Binnori has written in his article Yateematu-l-Bayaan'' that his reverend teacher Sayyid Muhammad Anwar Shah Kashmiri used to say:

See also 

 Tafsir al-Baydawi
 Tafsir al-Nisaburi
 List of tafsir works
 List of Sunni books

References

Books by Fakhr al-Din al-Razi
Razi
12th-century Arabic books